Michał Białk (born March 4, 1982 Kraków, Poland) is a Polish classical pianist.

Białk began piano lessons at the age of five, and enrolled in the National Ignacy Jan Paderewski Music School in Kraków two years later. He studied in Freiburg im Breisgau, Paris, Amsterdam, Rostock and Vienna. His major teachers include Elza Kolodin, Matthias Kirschnereit and Oleg Maisenberg. Since its debut at the Krakow Philharmonic, he won prizes at international piano competitions in France, Italy, Spain, Poland and Turkey. Michał Białk gives concerts throughout the world, including Musikverein in Vienna, Stadtcasino in Basel, Festspielhaus Baden-Baden, Vienna State Opera, Hamburg Opera, Konserthuset Stockholm, Salle Cortot in Paris.

Recordings
 Fryderyk Chopin, Michał Białk plays Chopin, 2002
 Ludwig van Beethoven, Sergei Prokofiev Sonatas, 2006
 Fryderyk Chopin, Nocturnes, 2008

References

External links
  Michał Białk's website
 
 

1982 births
Living people
Musicians from Kraków
Polish classical pianists
Male classical pianists
21st-century classical pianists
21st-century male musicians